Mount Chambers Gorge (alternative name: Marlawadinha Inbiri) is a gorge in the Australian state of South Australia in the locality of Wertaloona about  north-east of Blinman in the Flinders Ranges. 

Although on private land, they are a tourist attraction near to the road between Blinman and Balcanoona, Gammon Ranges National Park. They are part of the Wearing Hills.

Mount Chambers Gorge winds through the Wearing Hills toward Lake Frome.  There is usually water in the bed of the creek, although less in recent years than formerly; while it is brackish it can be used by campers (given appropriate treatment).  The upper part of the Gorge is accessible to most vehicles while the lower parts are now  closed to all but foot traffic  and can no longer be accessed by four-wheel-drive. There is signage at the car park indicating the closure of the lower gorge to vehicle traffic.

Mount Chambers Chasm

The upper part of Mount Chambers is composed of a limestone that is resistant to erosion. The resistance of the limestone and the greater erodibility of the underlying rock has resulted in the upper part of the mesa being mostly surrounded by precipitous walls.

The chasm extends about 50 metres across the width of the Mount Chambers mesa near its eastern end. The top of the chasm is about three metres wide at the south-eastern end and two metres at the north-western end.

It seems that the eastern end of the mountain has somehow moved away from the remainder. The top of the chasm is apparently wider than the bottom, indicating some hinging of the end of the mountain.

The bottom of the chasm is covered with rubble and soil that has fallen from above. Some boulders have fallen only a part of the way down and have bridged between the two walls.

The depth of the chasm, from the top to the rubble on the bottom, is around ten to fifteen metres.

It is possible, with great care, but without any special climbing gear, to climb down over some of the bridging boulders to the base of the chasm. There is a section near the centre of the chasm where a V shaped set of fractures comes off the chasm. The bridging boulders in this area seem to provide the only path from top to bottom.

References

External links
Chambers Gorge, Flinders Ranges - South Australian History
http://ramblingsdc.net/Australia/Chambers.html Mount Chambers Chasm

Flinders Ranges
Mountains of South Australia
Far North (South Australia)